The year 1943 in film featured various significant events for the film industry.

Top-grossing films (U.S.)
The top ten 1943 released films by box office gross in North America are as follows:

Events
 January 23 – The film Casablanca is released nationally in the United States and becomes one of the top-grossing pictures of 1943. It goes on to win the Best Picture and Best Director awards at the 16th Academy Awards.
 February 20 – American film studio executives agree to allow the United States Office of War Information to censor films.
 June 1 – Veteran English stage and screen actor Leslie Howard dies at the age of 50 in the crash of BOAC Flight 777 off the coast of Galicia, Spain. While best remembered for his role as Ashley Wilkes in Gone with the Wind, Howard had roles in many other notable films and was twice nominated for the Academy Award for Best Actor.
 November 23 – British Forces Broadcasting Service begins operation
 December 31 – New York City's Times Square greets Frank Sinatra at Paramount Theater

Awards

Top Ten Money Making Stars

1943 film releases
United States

January–March
January 1943
12 January
Shadow of a Doubt
23 January
Casablanca
February 1943
3 February
Air Force
5 February
The Outlaw
11 February
No Place for a Lady
12 February
Journey into Fear
14 February
Star Spangled Rhythm
19 February
Saludos Amigos
20 February
The Hard Way
March 1943
1 March
Squadron Leader X (GB)
2 March
The Human Comedy
3 March
Münchhausen (Germany)
5 March
Frankenstein Meets the Wolf Man
10 March
It Ain't Hay
11 March
Hello, Frisco, Hello
15 March
The Silver Fleet (GB)
19 March
Hitler's Children
22 March
Huella de luz (Spain)
25 March
Sanshiro Sugata (Japan)
26 March
Forever and a Day
27 March
Hangmen Also Die!

April–June
April 1943
2 April
Border Patrol
9 April
Cabin in the Sky
It Comes Up Love
12 April
Fires Were Started
15 April
We Dive at Dawn
22 April
Crash Dive
23 April
Clancy Street Boys
24 April
Edge of Darkness
30 April
I Walked with a Zombie
Sherlock Holmes in Washington
May 1943
4 May
Five Graves to Cairo
7 May
They Came to Blow Up America
This Land Is Mine
8 May
The Leopard Man
13 May
The More the Merrier
14 May
Bombardier
16 May
Ossessione (Italy)
17 May
The Bells Go Down
21 May
Action in the North Atlantic
Cowboy in Manhattan
The Ox-Bow Incident
22 May
Mission to Moscow
27 May
Prelude to War
28 May
Mr. Lucky
June 1943
2 June
Hit the Ice
3 June
Bataan
10 June
The Life and Death of Colonel Blimp
11 June
Coney Island
22 June
Crime Doctor
So Proudly We Hail!
23 June
Angels of the Streets (France)
The Constant Nymph

July–September
July 1943
3 July
Background to Danger
16 July
For Whom the Bell Tolls
17 July
Victory Through Air Power
21 July
Stormy Weather
26 July
Theatre Royal (GB)
August 1943
1 August
Behind the Rising Sun
2 August
Hi Diddle Diddle
Nasreddin in Bukhara (U.S.S.R.)
11 August
Heaven Can Wait
12 August
Phantom of the Opera
14 August
This Is the Army
19 August
Destroyer
DuBarry Was a Lady
21 August
The Seventh Victim
23 August
The Man in Grey (GB)
27 August
Holy Matrimony
Watch on the Rhine
30 August
We've Never Been Licked
September 1943
2 September
The Sky's the Limit
10 September
The Kansan
13 September
Thousands Cheer
16 September
Doña Bárbara (Mexico)
17 September
Revenge of the Zombies
Sherlock Holmes Faces Death
Top Man
24 September
The Adventures of Tartu (GB)
25 September
Thank Your Lucky Stars
28 September
Le Corbeau (France)
29 September
Corvette K-225

October–December
October 1943
7 October
Lassie Come Home
8 October
Best Foot Forward
Crazy House
13 October
L'Éternel retour (France)
19 October
Yellow Canary (GB)
23 October
Princess O'Rourke
29 October
Flesh and Fantasy
November 1943
4 November
The North Star
5 November
Guadalcanal Diary
Millions Like Us (GB)
Son of Dracula
10 November
No Time for Love
Titanic (Germany)
11 November
The Return of the Vampire
Sahara
12 November
The Mad Ghoul
13 November
Day of Wrath (Denmark)
Northern Pursuit
19 November
The Dancing Masters
23 November
Cry 'Havoc'
26 November
Girl Crazy
27 November
Old Acquaintance
December 1943
3 December
Happy Land
6 December
War of the Wildcats
14 December
The Shipbuilders (GB)
15 December
Destination Tokyo
Madame Curie
17 December
Calling Dr. Death
Immensee (Germany)
20 December
The Demi-Paradise (GB)
21 December
The Song of Bernadette
24 December
The Gang's All Here
The Ghost Ship
Jack London
29 December
Tender Comrade
31 December
The Woman of the Town

Notable films released in 1943
United States unless stated

A
Above Suspicion, starring Joan Crawford and Fred MacMurray
Action in the North Atlantic, starring Humphrey Bogart and Raymond Massey
The Adventures of Tartu, starring Robert Donat and Valerie Hobson – (GB)
Air Force, directed by Howard Hawks, starring John Garfield
Angels of the Streets (Les anges du peche), directed by Robert Bresson – (France)

B
Background to Danger, directed by Raoul Walsh, starring George Raft and Peter Lorre
Bataan, directed by Tay Garnett, starring Robert Taylor and Lloyd Nolan
Behind the Rising Sun, starring Tom Neal, produced by Howard Hughes
The Bells Go Down, starring Tommy Trinder and James Mason – (GB)
Best Foot Forward, starring Lucille Ball, William Gaxton, Virginia Weidler
Bombardier, starring Pat O'Brien, Randolph Scott, Anne Shirley
Border Patrol, starring William Boyd, George Reeves, Robert Mitchum

C
Cabin in the Sky, directed by Vincente Minnelli, starring Ethel Waters
Calling Dr. Death, first of the Inner Sanctum Mysteries, starring Lon Chaney, Jr.
Clancy Street Boys, starring The East Side Kids
Coney Island, starring Betty Grable
The Constant Nymph, starring Joan Fontaine
Le Corbeau (The Raven), directed by Henri-Georges Clouzot, starring Pierre Fresnay – (France)
Corvette K-225, starring Randolph Scott
O Costa do Castelo (The Costa from the Castle) – (Portugal)
Cowboy in Manhattan
Crash Dive, starring Tyrone Power and Anne Baxter
Crazy House, starring Ole Olsen and Chic Johnson
The Crew of the Dora (Besatzung Dora) – (Germany)
Crime Doctor, starring Warner Baxter
Cry 'Havoc', starring Margaret Sullavan, Ann Sothern, Joan Blondell

D
The Dancing Masters, starring Laurel and Hardy
Day of Wrath (Vredens Dag), directed by Carl Theodor Dreyer – (Denmark)
The Demi-Paradise, starring Laurence Olivier – (GB)
Desert Victory, a propaganda documentary – (GB)
Destination Tokyo, starring Cary Grant and John Garfield
Destroyer, starring Glenn Ford and Edward G. Robinson
Doña Bárbara, directed by Fernando de Fuentes – (Mexico)
DuBarry Was a Lady, starring Lucille Ball and Red Skelton

E
Edge of Darkness, starring Errol Flynn and Ann Sheridan
L'Éternel retour (The Eternal Return), directed by Jean Cocteau, starring Jean Marais – (France)

F
Fires Were Started, directed by Humphrey Jennings – (GB)
Five Graves to Cairo, directed by Billy Wilder, starring Franchot Tone and Anne Baxter
Flesh and Fantasy, starring Edward G. Robinson, Barbara Stanwyck and Charles Boyer
Flor Silvestre, starring Dolores del Río – (Mexico)
Forces Occultes, directed by Jean Marny, starring Maurice Rémy, Marcel Vibert, Auguste Bovério, Giséle Parry – (France)
For Whom the Bell Tolls, directed by Sam Wood, starring Gary Cooper and Ingrid Bergman
Forever and a Day, featuring an all-star cast
Frankenstein Meets the Wolf Man starring Lon Chaney, Jr. and Béla Lugosi
Der Fuehrer's Face, Donald Duck's Academy Award-winning short

G
The Gang's All Here, directed by Busby Berkeley, starring Alice Faye and Carmen Miranda
The Ghost Ship, starring Richard Dix
Girl Crazy, starring Judy Garland and Mickey Rooney
Guadalcanal Diary, starring Lloyd Nolan, Richard Conte, Preston Foster, William Bendix, Anthony Quinn
A Guy Named Joe, starring Spencer Tracy and Irene Dunne

H
Hangmen Also Die!, starring Brian Donlevy and Walter Brennan
Happy Land, starring Don Ameche and Frances Dee
The Hard Way, starring Ida Lupino
Harlem, directed by Carmine Gallone, starring Massimo Girotti and Amedeo Nazzari (Italy)
Heaven Can Wait, directed by Ernst Lubitsch, starring Gene Tierney and Don Ameche
Hello, Frisco, Hello, starring Alice Faye
Hi Diddle Diddle, starring Adolphe Menjou and Pola Negri
Hit the Ice, starring Bud Abbott and Lou Costello
Hitler's Children, directed by Edward Dmytryk
Holy Matrimony, starring Monty Woolley and Gracie Fields
Huella de luz (A Sight of Light) – (Spain)
The Human Comedy, starring Mickey Rooney

I
I Walked with a Zombie, starring Frances Dee
Immensee (aka Immensee: A German Folksong) – (Germany)
It Ain't Hay, starring Bud Abbott and Lou Costello
It Comes Up Love, starring Gloria Jean and Donald O'Connor

J
Jack London, starring Michael O'Shea and Susan Hayward
Jane Eyre, directed by Robert Stevenson, starring Orson Welles and Joan Fontaine
Journey into Fear, starring Joseph Cotten, Dolores del Río, Orson Welles

K
The Kansan, starring Richard Dix and Jane Wyatt
Kismet, starring Ashok Kumar – (India)

L
Lassie Come Home, starring Roddy McDowall and Donald Crisp
The Leopard Man, directed by Jacques Tourneur, starring Dennis O'Keefe
The Life and Death of Colonel Blimp, directed by Michael Powell and Emeric Pressburger, starring Roger Livesey, Deborah Kerr, Anton Walbrook – (GB)

M
The Mad Ghoul, starring George Zucco
Madame Curie, starring Greer Garson and Walter Pidgeon
The Man in Grey, the first of the Gainsborough melodramas starring Margaret Lockwood and James Mason – (GB)
María Candelaria, starring Dolores del Río and Pedro Armendáriz – (Mexico)
Meshes of the Afternoon, directed by Maya Deren and Alexander Hammid
Millions Like Us, directed by Sidney Gilliat and Frank Launder – (GB)
Mission to Moscow, directed by Michael Curtiz, starring Walter Huston
Mister Big, starring Donald O'Connor and Gloria Jean
The More the Merrier, directed by George Stevens, starring Jean Arthur and Joel McCrea
Mr. Lucky, starring Cary Grant
Münchhausen – (Germany)
My Learned Friend, starring Will Hay – (GB)

N
Nasreddin in Bukhara – (U.S.S.R.)
No Place for a Lady, starring William Gargan and Phyllis Brooks
No Time for Love, starring Claudette Colbert and Fred MacMurray
The North Star, starring Anne Baxter and Dana Andrews
Northern Pursuit, starring Errol Flynn

O
Old Acquaintance, starring Bette Davis and Miriam Hopkins
Ossessione (Obsession), directed by Luchino Visconti – (Italy)
The Outlaw, controversial western directed by Howard Hughes, starring Jane Russell
The Ox-Bow Incident, directed by William Wellman, starring Henry Fonda, Harry Morgan, Dana Andrews

P
Phantom of the Opera, starring Claude Rains
Prelude to War, directed by Frank Capra
Princess O'Rourke, starring Olivia de Havilland and Robert Cummings

R
The Return of the Vampire, starring Béla Lugosi
Revenge of the Zombies, starring John Carradine
Riding High, starring Dorothy Lamour and Dick Powell

S
Sahara, starring Humphrey Bogart
Saludos Amigos, a Walt Disney animated film starring Donald Duck and Goofy
Sanshiro Sugata, directed by Akira Kurosawa – (Japan)
The Seventh Victim, starring Tom Conway
Shadow of a Doubt, directed by Alfred Hitchcock, starring Teresa Wright and Joseph Cotten
Sherlock Holmes Faces Death, directed by Roy William Neill, starring Basil Rathbone and Nigel Bruce, co-starring Hillary Brooke
Sherlock Holmes in Washington, directed by Roy William Neill, starring Basil Rathbone and Nigel Bruce, co-starring Henry Daniell and George Zucco
The Shipbuilders, directed by John Baxter – (GB)
The Silver Fleet, starring Ralph Richardson and Googie Withers – (GB)
The Sky's the Limit, starring Fred Astaire and Joan Leslie
So Proudly We Hail!, starring Claudette Colbert, Paulette Goddard, Veronica Lake
Son of Dracula, starring Lon Chaney Jr.
The Song of Bernadette, starring Jennifer Jones
Squadron Leader X, starring Eric Portman and Ann Dvorak – (GB)
Stormy Weather, starring Lena Horne, Bill Robinson, Cab Calloway and the Nicholas Brothers
 Strange Inheritance, starring Assia Noris and Jules Berry  – (France)
A Stranger in Town, starring Frank Morgan

T
Tender Comrade, starring Ginger Rogers and Robert Ryan
Thank Your Lucky Stars, starring Eddie CantorTheatre Royal, starring Bud Flanagan and Chesney Allen – (GB)They Came to Blow Up America, starring George SandersThis is the Army, directed by Michael CurtizThis Land Is Mine, directed by Jean Renoir, starring Charles Laughton and Maureen O'HaraThousands Cheer, starring Gene Kelly, Kathryn Grayson, Mary AstorTitanic – (Germany)Top Man, starring Donald O'Connor
UUkraine in Flames – (U.S.S.R.)
VVictory Through Air Power, a propaganda film by Disney
WWar of the Wildcats (a.k.a. In Old Oklahoma), starring John WayneWatch on the Rhine, starring Paul Lukas and Bette DavisWe Dive at Dawn, directed by Anthony Asquith, starring John Mills – (GB)We've Never Been Licked, starring Richard Quine and Noah Beery, Jr.Whistling in Brooklyn, starring Red SkeltonThe Woman of the Town, starring Claire Trevor and Albert Dekker
YYellow Canary, starring Anna Neagle and Richard Greene – (GB)

SerialsAdventures of the Flying CadetsThe Adventures of Smilin' JackBatman, starring Lewis WilsonDaredevils of the West, starring Allan Lane, directed by John EnglishDon Winslow of the Coast GuardG-Men vs the Black Dragon, starring Rod Cameron, directed by Spencer Gordon BennetThe Masked Marvel, directed by Spencer Gordon BennetThe Phantom, starring Tom TylerSecret Service in Darkest Africa, starring Rod Cameron, directed by Spencer Gordon Bennet

Comedy film seriesBuster Keaton (1917–1944)Laurel and Hardy (1921-1945)Our Gang (1922–1944)The Marx Brothers (1929–1946)The Three Stooges (1934–1959)

Animated short film seriesMickey Mouse (1928–1953)Looney Tunes (1930–1969)Terrytoons (1930–1964)Merrie Melodies (1931–1969)Scrappy (1931–1941)Popeye (1933–1957)Color Rhapsodies (1934–1949)Donald Duck (1934–1956)Daffy Duck (1937 – 1966)Goofy (1939–1955)Andy Panda (1939–1949)Tom and Jerry (1940–1958)Woody Woodpecker (1941–1949)Swing Symphonies (1941–1945)The Fox and the Crow (1941–1950)Red Hot Riding Hood (1943–1949)Chip 'n Dale (1943–1956)Droopy (1943–1958)

Births
January 1 – Don Novello, American writer, film director, producer, actor, singer and comedian
January 13 – Richard Moll, American actor
January 14 – Holland Taylor, American actress
January 18
Paul Angelis, English actor and writer (died 2009)
Paul Freeman, English actor
January 19 - Larry Clark, American director, producer and writer
January 24 – Sharon Tate, American actress and model (murdered 1969)
January 25 – Tobe Hooper, American director and screenwriter (died 2017)
January 28 – John Beck, American actor
January 31 – Peter McRobbie, Scottish-born American actor
February 1 - Linda Gaye Scott, American actress
February 3 – Blythe Danner, American actress
February 9 – Joe Pesci, American actor
February 20 – Mike Leigh, English director
February 25 – George Harrison, English musician and songwriter (died 2001)
February 26 – Bill Duke, American actor and director
March 8 – Lynn Redgrave, English actress (died 2010)
March 15 – David Cronenberg, Canadian director and screenwriter
March 25 – Paul Michael Glaser, American actor and director
March 29
Eric Idle, English actor, comedian, author and musician
Vangelis, Greek-born film composer (died 2022)
March 31 – Christopher Walken, American actor
April 8 – Jack O'Halloran, American actor
April 10 - Tom Pollock, American producer (died 2020)
April 20 – Edie Sedgwick, American actress, socialite, model and heiress (died 1971)
April 26 – Leon Pownall, Welsh-Canadian actor (died 2006)
May 25 - Leslie Uggams, American actress and singer
May 27 – Raye Birk, American actor
June 2 – Charles Haid, American actor and film director
June 4 - Tom Luddy, American producer (died 2023)
June 7 – Michael Pennington, English actor, director and writer
June 11 - Oleg Vidov, Russian-American actor, director and producer (died 2017)
June 13 – Malcolm McDowell, English actor
June 22
Judith Barker, English actress
Klaus Maria Brandauer, Austrian actor and director
June 23 – Patrick Bokanowski, French director
June 24 – Georg Stanford Brown, American actor and director
July 3 – Kurtwood Smith, American actor
July 11 - Tom Holland (filmmaker), American screenwriter, actor and director
July 21
Michael Caton, Australian actor, comedian and television host
Edward Herrmann, American actor (died 2014)
July 25 - Janet Margolin, American actress (died 1993)
July 29 - Jim Ishida, Japanese-American character actor
August 15 – Barbara Bouchet, German-American actress
August 17 – Robert De Niro, American actor
August 18 – Martin Mull, American actor and comedian
August 21
Lino Capolicchio, Italian actor, screenwriter and director (died 2022)
Hugh Wilson, American director, writer, television showrunner and actor (died 2018)
August 27 – Tuesday Weld, actress
September 1 – Don Stroud, American actor and musician
September 3 – Valerie Perrine, American actress and model
September 5 - Jack Charles, Australian actor (died 2022)
September 9 – Art LaFleur, American character actor and acting coach (died 2021)
September 10 – Daniel Truhitte, American actor
September 19 - Diana Bellamy, American character actress (died 2001)
September 21 – Jerry Bruckheimer, producer
September 23 - Toni Basil, American singer, actress and director
September 24 – Randall Duk Kim, Korean American stage, film and television actor
September 28 – J. T. Walsh, American character actor (died 1998)
October 4 – John Bindon, English actor and bodyguard (died 1993)
October 8 – Chevy Chase, American actor and comedian
October 12 – Lin Shaye, American actress
October 15 – Penny Marshall, American television actress, film director and producer (died 2018)
October 20 – George Wyner, American actor
October 22
Jan de Bont, Dutch cinematographer, director and producer
Catherine Deneuve, French actress
October 24 – Martin Campbell, New Zealand director
October 27 - Carmen Argenziano, American actor (died 2019)
October 29
Margaret Nolan, English actress (died 2020)
Don Simpson, American producer, screenwriter and actor (died 1996)
November 1 – John McEnery, English actor and writer (died 2019)
November 5 – Sam Shepard, American actor (died 2017)
November 7 – Michael Byrne, British actor
November 10 - William Hoyland, English actor (died 2017)
November 12
Valerie Leon, English actress and model
Wallace Shawn, American actor
November 20 – Mie Hama, former Japanese actress, radio and television presenter
November 23 – Tony Bonner, Australian actor and singer
November 28
George T. Miller, Scottish-Australian director and producer (died 2023)
Randy Newman, American singer, film composer
December 12
Gianni Russo, American actor and singer
Phyllis Somerville, American actress (died 2020)
December 13 – Arturo Ripstein, Mexican director
December 16 – Patti Deutsch, American voice artist, actress and comedian (died 2017)
December 21 – Jack Nance, American actor (died 1996)
December 23 – Harry Shearer, American voice actor
December 31 
Ben Kingsley, English actor
Victor Raider-Wexler, American actor

Deaths
January 25 – Spencer Charters, 67, American actor, The Affairs of Jimmy Valentine, The Postman Didn't RingFebruary 14 – Dora Gerson, 43, German actress, Caravan of Death, On the Brink of ParadiseFebruary 19 – Lynne Overman, 58, American actor, Little Miss Marker, Union Pacific, DixieFebruary 20 – Donald Haines, 23, American child actor, Skippy, A Tale of Two CitiesMarch 10 – Tully Marshall, 78, American actor, Paid in Full, The Big TrailApril 3 – Conrad Veidt, 50, German actor, Casablanca, The Cabinet of Dr. Caligari, The Thief of Baghdad, The Spy in BlackJune 1 – Leslie Howard, 50, Academy Award-nominated British actor, Gone with the Wind, Pygmalion, The Petrified Forest, Of Human BondageJune 30 – Carlo Wieth, 57, Danish actor
July 16 – Arthur Byron, 71, American actor, 20,000 Years in Sing Sing, Gabriel Over the White House Film Debuts 
June Allyson – Best Foot ForwardJeanne Crain – The Gang's All HereHume Cronyn – Shadow of a DoubtRhonda Fleming – In Old OklahomaAl Hirschfeld – Cabin in the SkyKim Hunter – The Seventh VictimRichard Jaeckel – Guadalcanal DiaryDorothy McGuire – ClaudiaRobert Mitchum – The Human ComedyDorothy Malone – Gildersleeve on BroadwayElla Raines – Corvette K-225Jane Russell – The OutlawCliff Robertson – We've Never Been LickedLawrence Tierney – Gildersleeve on BroadwayShelley Winters – There's Something About a SoldierNatalie Wood – The Moon Is Down''

References

Further reading
 Historical Events for Year 1943 (Part 5)

 
Film by year